Erena Mikaere (born 9 July 1988) is a former New Zealand netball international. Mikaere was a member of three premiership winning teams. She was a prominent member of the Sunshine Coast Lightning teams that won the 2017 and 2018 Suncorp Super Netball titles. She was also a fringe member of the 2012 Waikato Bay of Plenty Magic team that won the ANZ Championship title. During the ANZ Championship era, she also played for Southern Steel and West Coast Fever. She was the first New Zealand player to play for an Australian ANZ Championship team. During the ANZ Premiership era, she has played for Northern Mystics and Waikato Bay of Plenty Magic.

Early life, family and education
Mikaere is a Māori with Te Arawa and Tūhourangi affiliations. She was born in Rotorua. She also has Scottish ancestry on her mother's side. Her parents are Brenda and Kerry. She attended Rotorua Lakes High School. While playing for Waikato Bay of Plenty Magic, Southern Steel and West Coast Fever, Mikaere was in a relationship with William Creighton. They lived together in Invercargill and Western Australia. In October 2009, Mikaere gave birth to a daughter, Bileigh Creighton.

Playing career

ANZ Championship

Waikato Bay of Plenty Magic
Between 2011 and 2013, Mikaere was included in Waikato Bay of Plenty Magic squads for the ANZ Championship. She was a member of Noeline Taurua's 2012 Waikato Bay of Plenty Magic team that won the ANZ Championship title. In three seasons at Magic, Mikaere played just 31 minutes and 13 seconds, spread across five matches. She was kept out of the team by Casey Kopua and Leana de Bruin.

Southern Steel
Ahead of the 2014 ANZ Championship season, Mikaere signed for Southern Steel. However, much of Mikaere's 2014 season was spent watching from the bench with the likes of Rachel Rasmussen, Phoenix Karaka and Storm Purvis keeping her out of the team. She made just five appearances for Steel.

West Coast Fever
In 2015 and 2016, Mikaere played for West Coast Fever. She was the first New Zealand player to play for an Australian ANZ Championship team. While playing for Fever, Mikaere also played for Western Sting in the Australian Netball League.

Sunshine Coast Lightning
Ahead of the inaugural 2017 Suncorp Super Netball season, Mikaere joined Sunshine Coast Lightning. Reuniting with Noeline Taurua, she was subsequently a prominent member of the Lightning teams that won the 2017 and 2018 Suncorp Super Netball titles. Mikaere made 15 senior appearances for Lightning. While playing for Lightning, Mikaere guested for and captained Team Northumbria in the 2017 British Fast5 Netball All-Stars Championship.

ANZ Championship

Northern Mystics
Ahead of the 2019 ANZ Premiership season, Mikaere signed for Northern Mystics. She made 15 appearances for Mystics.

Waikato Bay of Plenty Magic
Since 2020, Mikaere has played for Waikato Bay of Plenty Magic. On 1 June 2022, in a match against Northern Stars, Mikaere made her 100th senior league appearance.

Statistics

|- 
! scope="row" style="text-align:center" | 2019
|style="text-align:center;"|Mystics
||0/0||0||23||8||1||35||68||149||16||15
|- style="background-color: #eaeaea"
! scope="row" style="text-align:center" | 2020
|style="text-align:center;"|Magic
|0/0||0||21||14||1||12||53||137||11||13
|- 
! scope="row" style="text-align:center" | 2021
|style="text-align:center;"|Magic
|0/0||0||9||38||0||11||63||177||12||15
|- style="background-color: #eaeaea"
! scope="row" style="text-align:center" | 2022
|style="text-align:center;"|Magic
|0/0||?||20||7||0||9||60||144||7||14
|- class="sortbottom"
! colspan=2| Career
! 
! 
! 
! 
! 
! 
! 
! 
! 
! 
|}

New Zealand
On 13 January 2019, Mikaere made her only senior appearance for New Zealand against England during the 2019 Netball Quad Series. She came on as a replacement for Jane Watson in the third quarter. Mikaere has also played for New Zealand A and Mixed Invitational teams in the Cadbury Netball Series.

Television
Mikaere has worked as television presenter for Whakaata Māori. Together with Stacey Fluhler and Liam Messam, she hosts Te Ao Toa, a sports show with a Māori perspective.

Honours
Sunshine Coast Lightning
Suncorp Super Netball
Winners: 2017, 2018
Runners Up: 2019
Minor Premierships: 2019
Waikato Bay of Plenty Magic
ANZ Championship
Winners: 2012

References

1988 births
Living people
New Zealand netball players
New Zealand Māori netball players
New Zealand international netball players
Waikato Bay of Plenty Magic players
Southern Steel players
West Coast Fever players
Western Sting players
Sunshine Coast Lightning players
Team Northumbria netball players
Northern Mystics players
ANZ Championship players
Australian Netball League players
Suncorp Super Netball players
ANZ Premiership players
New Zealand expatriate netball people in Australia
New Zealand expatriate netball people in England
Sportspeople from Rotorua
Te Arawa people
Tuhourangi people
New Zealand people of Scottish descent
New Zealand women television presenters